New Community (New Comm) is a student housing cooperative located in East Lansing, Michigan and a member house of the Michigan State University Student Housing Cooperative (MSU SHC). After having been founded as an independent cooperative in the 1960s, New Community has undergone a series of changes and remains a staple of progressive living in the region.

History

In 1969, a group of East Lansing residents, calling themselves New Community, established an independent cooperative with the goal of creating a less structured, counter-cultural living experience.  

The location of New Community moved several times during the 1970s and 1980s. After the original house was initially moved from its location on Albert Avenue to M.A.C. Avenue, the location moved once again. Using money procured from a loan from the U.S. Department of Housing and Urban Development, the MSU SHC was able to purchase homes at 415 and 425 Ann Street. New Community existed as a two house cooperative until 1981 when the properties were split and New Community became exclusively located at its current location at 425 Ann Street. The property at 415 Ann Street was split into a separate housing cooperative in 1995, Toad Lane. Despite the split, the two houses reportedly still retain close relations.

In 2010 and 2011, the house underwent a series of home improvement projects.

Current House

New Community is currently located at 425 Ann Street on the corner of Division Street, two blocks north of Michigan State University's campus. The house contains seven single resident and four double resident bedrooms. The house is most commonly referred to as "New Comm." Residents of the co-op generally seek counter culture.

References
Student Housing Cooperative, Inc. (2023). "New Community Cooperative" http://msu.coop/new-community

Housing cooperatives in the United States

Housing cooperatives